Survivor: China is the fifteenth season of the American CBS competitive reality television series Survivor. The premiere aired September 20, 2007. Host Jeff Probst claimed the show was the first full American TV series to be filmed entirely within China. The specific location is in Mountain Lu West Sea, Jiujiang. It is also the northernmost Survivor season held to date, well outside of the tropical zone. Applications were due on January 30, 2007. Around March 2007, about 800 applicants were selected for an interview by CBS. Out of those 800, 48 semi-finalists were selected to go to Los Angeles in April–May 2007. From these semi-finalists, 16 were selected to participate in the show between June and August 2007. The final contestants and their original tribes, Fei Long and Zhan Hu, meaning Flying Dragon and Fighting Tiger respectively, were officially announced on August 20, 2007. The merged tribe was Hae Da Fung, which means Black Fighting Wind, a name proposed by Peih-Gee Law.

The "Outwit, Outplay, Outlast" slogan used in previous seasons' logos has been replaced by Chinese characters. The characters translate to "compete in intelligence" (bĭ zhìhuì), "compete in skill" (bĭ jìqiǎo), and "compete in endurance" (bĭ nàilì). Each tribe received a copy of The Art of War by Sun Tzu. As stated by Probst: "Survivor is a war. The book deals with leadership and how you defeat the other tribe. It's interesting how much it plays into the game all the way through." The show had "unprecedented access" to several historical Chinese monuments, including the Shaolin Temple and the Great Wall of China.

Exile Island from the previous three seasons was not used for this season, but the Hidden Immunity Idol was still part of the game. In lieu of Exile Island, the tribes had the ability to kidnap a player from the opposing tribe as part of winning a Reward Challenge. The kidnapped player remained with that tribe until the next Immunity Challenge and received a clue to the location of an Immunity Idol at that camp. However, this clue had to be given, unread, to a member of the other tribe prior to the next Immunity Challenge. Ultimately, neither of the two Idols available to the castaways were used; James Clement was voted out with both in his possession. Three players went to the Final Tribal Council, continuing the pattern that began in Survivor: Cook Islands and again in Survivor: Fiji. Probst explained that having a final three "prohibits one person winning through to the end and then taking an extremely unlikable person with them." In the end, Todd Herzog won, defeating Courtney Yates and Amanda Kimmel by a vote of 4–2–1. During the reunion, James Clement was awarded a $100,000 prize as the most popular player in Survivor: China, beating fellow favorites Denise Martin and Peih-Gee Law.

Contestants

Season 15 features 16 new castaways, split into two tribes. The translation for Fei Long and Zhan Hu mean Flying Dragon and Fighting Tiger respectively. The name of the merge tribe created by Peih-Gee Law, Hae Da Fung, translates to Black Fighting Wind. Among the 16 contestants who competed in this season were poker player Jean-Robert Bellande, the 2005 WWE Raw Diva Search winner Ashley Massaro.

Future appearances
James Clement and Amanda Kimmel both returned to compete in the following season, Survivor: Micronesia. The pair returned again in 2010 for Survivor: Heroes vs. Villains along with Courtney Yates. Peih-Gee Law returned for Survivor: Cambodia.

Outside of Survivor, Michael Zernow competed on American Ninja Warrior seasons 3 to 5.

Season summary
The two tribes, Fei Long and Zhan Hu, were predetermined prior to the start of the game. As an added bonus for winning reward challenges, the winning tribe was given the opportunity to kidnap a member from the losing tribe, where they would live at the winning tribe's camp (in cases where the reward is a trip away from camp, participate in the reward trip with the winning tribe as well) until the next Immunity Challenge. This person would receive a container with a clue to the hidden immunity idol that they had to give to one of the winning tribe members.

After the first 12 days, Fei Long held a slight edge thanks to the strength of James and leadership of Aaron. A strong alliance had been formed on Fei Long between Todd, Amanda, Aaron, and Courtney. On Day 14, each tribe, separately, selected two members of the other tribe to bring into theirs; Fei Long selected Sherea and Frosti, while Zhan Hu selected James and Aaron. Believing that James and Aaron would remain true to the other Fei Long members when the merge occurred, Jaime and Peih-Gee struck a plan to lose the next Immunity Challenge on purpose so that they would be able to remove the former Fei Longs from the game. Zhan Hu would end up losing the challenge, and subsequently voted Aaron out.

On Fei Long, Todd had been working to find the Hidden Immunity Idol. At the next reward challenge on Day 16, Fei Long won and kidnapped James. With the clue from James, Todd was able to find the idol, which he gave to James to use and eliminate a Zhan Hu, and also told James that the same clues would apply at the Zhan Hu camp. While James found the second idol, Zhan Hu won the next immunity challenge thus rendering Todd's plan moot and leaving James with both idols.

The tribes merged on Day 19, with the former Fei Longs holding a 6–4 advantage. After voting out Jaime, Jean-Robert and Frosti, Amanda became concerned that James would not give back one of the two idols, and worked with her other tribe members to blindside him, with James leaving the game with the two idols still in his possession. The remaining Fei Long held on to their lead, and Todd, Amanda, and Courtney's alliance held strong and the three went to the Final Tribal Council.

At the Final Tribal Council, all three finalists were criticized by the jury: Amanda for being overly apologetic, Courtney for her sassy attitude, and Todd for his deception and manipulating the jury. Amanda couldn’t own her game and her moves and the jury believed that her game was attached to Todd’s. Courtney was criticized for not making strategic moves in the game and personally attacking some of the jury members. Unlike Amanda and Courtney, Todd owned his strategic game to earn the jury's respect, leading to his victory in a 4-2-1 decision over Courtney and Amanda, respectively.

In the case of multiple tribes or castaways who win reward or immunity, they are listed in order of finish, or alphabetically where it was a team effort; where one castaway won and invited others, the invitees are in brackets.

Episodes

Voting history

Reception
Survivor: China received positive reviews, and is a favorite among the fan-base due to the level of gameplay and entertaining cast of characters. The villanous gameplay of winner Todd Herzog, the snarky, sarcastic personality of runner-up Courtney Yates, and the entertainingly over the top personality of James Clement each received high praise from both fans and critics alike.  Dalton Ross of Entertainment Weekly ranked this season 16th out of 40 saying it "featured a really good cast stuck in a really bad location." In 2014, Joe Reid of The Wire ranked this season 13th out of 27. In 2015, a poll by Rob Has a Podcast ranked this season 6th out of 30 with Rob Cesternino ranking this season 11th. This was updated in 2021 during Cesternino's podcast, Survivor All-Time Top 40 Rankings, ranking 5th out of 40th. In 2020, Survivor fan site "Purple Rock Podcast" ranked this season 10th out of 40 citing its "truly fantastic cast". Later that same year, Inside Survivor ranked this season 6th out of 40 saying "what really makes this season so good is the way the cast interacts with each other."

Controversy
At the reunion show, Denise Martin claimed that she lost her job as a lunch lady after returning home from filming. As a result, producer Mark Burnett awarded her $50,000. However, the school district for which Denise worked later refuted her version of what happened after she returned from China. According to Douglas Public School District Superintendent Nancy T. Lane, Denise asked for and received a promotion to the higher-paying, full-time custodian position before filming began for Survivor. When Denise returned to work, she returned to her new position. She requested to transfer back to her old position but it was no longer available. On the December 19, 2007, broadcast of The Early Show, Denise apologized, stating that it was "not [her] intention to be misleading" and asked that the $50,000 be donated to the Elizabeth Glaser Pediatric AIDS Foundation.

References

External links
 Official CBS Survivor China Website

Jiangxi
15
2007 American television seasons
2007 in China
Television shows filmed in China
Television shows set in China